Harold Lea Fetherstonhaugh (1887–1971) was a Canadian architect from Montreal, Quebec.

Biography
He received a diploma from McGill University in architecture in 1909, before perfecting his work alongside brothers Edward Maxwell and William Sutherland Maxwell. He founded a partnership in 1923 with J. C. McDougall, and in founded a sole proprietorship in 1934, where he worked until 1955. He is perhaps best known as the architect of the Church of St. Andrew and St. Paul in Montreal. He also designed the Collegiate Gothic William and Henry Birks Building, home to the McGill University Faculty of Religious Studies.

External links
 Vieux-Montréal, fiche d'un concepteur : Harold Lea Fetherstonhaugh 
 Images Montréal : Harold Lea Fetherstonhaugh 
 Historic Places in Canada

References

1887 births
1971 deaths
Architects from Montreal
McGill School of Architecture alumni
Anglophone Quebec people